The Shoe Museum in Street, Somerset, England exhibited shoes dating from the Roman era to the present day. The museum closed on 27 September 2019.

It showed the history of the Clark family and their company C. & J. Clark and its connection with the development of shoemaking in the town. The Clarks started making slippers, shoes and boots in the town in the 1820s and the company grew, introducing mechanised processes in the 1860s. Production continued until after 2000 when it was moved off-shore, using third party factories, predominantly located in Asia. In the 19th century, in line with the family’s Quaker values, the capital was also extended beyond the factory to benefit social initiatives in Street: a school was founded so that young men and women could combine working in the factory with continuing their education, a theatre was opened, a library was built, along with an open-air swimming pool, known as Greenbank, and town hall. The company still has its headquarters in Street, behind a frontage which includes the clock tower and water tower, In 1993 the redundant factory buildings were converted to form Clarks Village.

The museum started in 1951, but was expanded in 1974.

It had examples of shoes from the 200 years of the companies history. The museum also included a display of machinery used in footwear production, and a selection of shop display showcards from the 1930s, 1950s and 1960s, and television advertisements.

The museum closed to the public on 27 September 2019, and its artefacts will be transferred to the nearby Alfred Gillett Trust.

See also
Concealed shoes

References

External links
The Shoe Museum (archived 16 July 2015)
Alfred Gillett Trust

Museums in Somerset
Shoe museums
Street, Somerset
Grade II listed museum buildings